Lauren Bertolacci (born ) is an Australian volleyball coach. She currently coaches Volley Luzern Men's Team in the NLA, the top division in Switzerland.

Lauren was an Australian female volleyball player. She was part of the Australia women's national volleyball team. from 2005 to 2015.

She participated in the 2014 FIVB Volleyball World Grand Prix.
On club level she played for FC Luzern in 2014.

References

External links
 Profile at FIVB.org
 Lauren Bertolacci to retire after Volleyball World Grand Prix in Canberra at smh.org

1985 births
Living people
Australian women's volleyball players
Place of birth missing (living people)
Setters (volleyball)